Aquilegia atrata, the dark columbine, is a currently accepted species in the Aquilegia vulgaris complex. It is not genetically distinguishable from the other members of the complex. As the common name suggests it typically, but not always, has dark flowers, either brown, purple or wine-colored.

References

atrata
Flora of Europe
Plants described in 1830